Know Risk is a financial education program developed by ANZIIF that comprises a website, social media network, Insurance Tracker app, My Risk web app, newsletter and high-school literacy programs. It provides information and tools for the Australia and New Zealand populations to help people understand insurance and risk in their every day life. Know Risk aims to reduce the level of underinsurance and non-insurance for individuals and small businesses across all classes of insurance while improving general knowledge and risk management planning.

History
Know Risk was developed following a series of natural disasters that affected Australia and New Zealand during the 2000s. Events such as the Black Saturday bushfires, the Christchurch earthquakes, Cyclone Yasi and the extensive flooding that blanketed Australia resulted in the tragic loss of both life and property. In many cases, those affected were underinsured, or not insured at all. Know Risk aims to counter this issue and improve community resilience.

Know Risk was conceived in 2011, and launched with Insurance Tracker on 12 June 2013 by The Hon Bill Shorten.

Know Risk was named the winner of a 2012 Resilient Australia Award and was highly commended at the National Resilient Australia Awards. Know Risk was shortlisted in the Industry category for the 2014 MoneySmart Week Awards.

Products and services
Know Risk covers all lines of insurance, including auto, health, house, life, travel as well as addressing technological risk, small business coverage and weather and disasters information. The website includes weekly articles, archived content, videos, interactive quizzes and insurance buying checklists. Know Risk also includes the My Risk web app, an interactive tool that allows people and business to see an overview of risks they face based on their demographics. Know Risk publishes a monthly newsletter to alert consumers to insurance and risk issues. Know Risk has an extensive social media network, including channels on Facebook, Twitter, Google+ and Pinterest.

Insurance tracker
Know Risk's Insurance Tracker app for iPhone was launched in 2013. The app allows users to upload policy and coverage information from any insurance provider, and to keep a photo inventory of belongings should they need them in the event of a claim.

References

External links
 Know Risk website

Personal finance education
Australian educational websites
Finance websites